Hollywood is a neighborhood in the central region of Los Angeles, California. Its name has come to be a shorthand reference for the U.S. film industry and the people associated with it. Many notable film studios, such as Columbia Pictures, Walt Disney Studios, Paramount Pictures, Warner Bros., and Universal Pictures, are located near or in Hollywood.

Hollywood was incorporated as a municipality in 1903. It was consolidated with the City of Los Angeles in 1910. Soon thereafter a prominent film industry emerged, having developed first on the East Coast. Eventually it became the most recognizable in the world.

History

Initial development

H. J. Whitley, a real estate developer, arranged to buy the  E.C. Hurd ranch. They agreed on a price and shook hands on the deal. Whitley shared his plans for the new town with General Harrison Gray Otis, publisher of the Los Angeles Times, and Ivar Weid, a prominent businessman in the area.

Daeida Wilcox, who donated land to help in the development of Hollywood, learned of the name Hollywood from an acquaintance who owned an estate by that name in Illinois.
Wilcox is quoted as saying, "I chose the name Hollywood simply because it sounds nice and because I'm superstitious and holly brings good luck."  She recommended the same name to her husband, Harvey H. Wilcox, who had purchased 120 acres on February 1, 1887. It was not until August 1887 that Wilcox decided to use that name and filed with the Los Angeles County Recorder's office on a deed and parcel map of the property.

By 1900, the region had a post office, newspaper, hotel, and two markets. A single-track streetcar line ran down the middle of Prospect Avenue from it, but service was infrequent and the trip took two hours. The old citrus fruit-packing house was converted into a livery stable, improving transportation for the inhabitants of Hollywood.

The Hollywood Hotel was opened in 1902 by Whitley, president of the Los Pacific Boulevard and Development Company. Having finally acquired the Hurd ranch and subdivided it, Whitley built the hotel to attract land buyers. Flanking the west side of Highland Avenue, the structure fronted on Prospect Avenue (later Hollywood Boulevard). Although it was still a dusty, unpaved road, it was regularly graded and graveled. The hotel became internationally known and was the center of the civic and social life and home of movie stars for many years.

Whitley's company developed and sold one of the early residential areas, the Ocean View Tract. Whitley did much to promote the area. He paid thousands of dollars to install electricity and arrange for electric lighting, and he built both a bank and a road into the Cahuenga Pass. The lighting ran for several blocks down Prospect Avenue. Whitley's land was centered on Highland Avenue. His 1918 development, Whitley Heights, was named for him.

Incorporation and merger
Hollywood was incorporated as a municipality on November 14, 1903, by a vote of 88 for and 77 against. On January 30, 1904, the voters in Hollywood decided, 113 to 96, to banish the sale of liquor within the city, except for medicinal purposes. Neither hotels nor restaurants were allowed to serve wine or liquor before or after meals.

In 1910, the city voted for a merger with Los Angeles in order to secure an adequate water supply and to gain access to the L.A. sewer system.

With annexation, the name of Prospect Avenue was changed to Hollywood Boulevard and all the street numbers in the new district changed. For example, 100 Prospect Avenue, at Vermont Avenue, became 6400 Hollywood Boulevard; and 100 Cahuenga Boulevard, at Hollywood Boulevard, changed to 1700 Cahuenga Boulevard.

Motion picture industry

By 1912, major motion-picture companies had come West to set up production near or in Los Angeles. 

In the early 1900s, most motion picture camera and equipment patents were held by Thomas Edison's Motion Picture Patents Company in New Jersey, which often sued filmmakers to stop their productions. To escape this, filmmakers began moving to Los Angeles, where attempts to enforce Edison's patents were easier to evade. Also, the weather was ideal for filmmaking and there was quick access to various settings. Los Angeles became the capital of the film industry in the United States. The mountains, plains and low land prices made Hollywood a good place to establish film studios.

Director D. W. Griffith was the first to make a motion picture in Hollywood. His 17-minute short film In Old California (1910) was filmed for the Biograph Company. Although Hollywood banned movie theaters—of which it had none—before annexation that year, Los Angeles had no such restriction.

The first studio in Hollywood opened in early 1913, on Formosa Avenue down the street from Helen Muir's home. Her father John Muir returned from his tour of Europe and East Africa a few months later and continued work on Yosemite and his book, The Yosemite. The Nestor Film Company was the first studio, established in October 1911 by the New Jersey-based Centaur Film Company in a roadhouse at 6121 Sunset Boulevard (the corner of Gower). Four major film companies – Paramount, Warner Bros., RKO, and Columbia – had studios in Hollywood, as did several minor companies and rental studios. In the 1920s, Hollywood was the fifth-largest industry in the nation. By the 1930s, Hollywood studios became fully vertically integrated, as production, distribution and exhibition was controlled by these companies, enabling Hollywood to produce 600 films per year.

Hollywood became known as Tinseltown
and the "dream factory" because of the glittering image of the movie industry.

Further development

A large sign reading HOLLYWOODLAND was erected in the Hollywood Hills in 1923 to advertise real estate developers Woodruff's and Shoults' housing development. In 1949, the Hollywood Chamber of Commerce entered a contract with the City of Los Angeles to repair and rebuild the sign. The agreement stipulated that LAND be removed to spell HOLLYWOOD so the sign would now refer to the district, rather than the housing development.

During the early 1950s, the Hollywood Freeway was constructed through the northeast corner of Hollywood.

The Capitol Records Building on Vine Street, just north of Hollywood Boulevard, was built in 1956. The Hollywood Walk of Fame was created in 1958 as a tribute to artists and other significant contributors to the entertainment industry. The official opening was on February 8, 1960.

The Hollywood Boulevard Commercial and Entertainment District was listed in the National Register of Historic Places in 1985.

In June 1999, the Hollywood extension of the Los Angeles County Metro Rail Red Line subway opened from Downtown Los Angeles to the San Fernando Valley, with stops along Hollywood Boulevard at Western Avenue (Hollywood/Western Metro station), Vine Street (Hollywood/Vine Metro station), and Highland Avenue (Hollywood/Highland Metro station).

The Dolby Theatre, which opened in 2001 as the Kodak Theatre at the Hollywood & Highland Center mall, is the site of the annual Academy Awards programs. The mall is located where the historic Hollywood Hotel once stood.

Revitalization
After the neighborhood underwent years of serious decline in the 1980s, with crime, drugs and increasing poverty among some residents, many landmarks were threatened with demolition. Columbia Square, at the northwest corner of Sunset Boulevard and Gower Street, is part of the ongoing rebirth of Hollywood. The Art Deco-style studio complex, completed in 1938, was once the Hollywood headquarters for CBS. It became home to a new generation of broadcasters when cable television networks MTV, Comedy Central, BET and Spike TV consolidated their offices there in 2014 as part of a $420 million office, residential and retail complex. 

Since 2000, Hollywood has been increasingly gentrified due to revitalization by private enterprise and public planners. Over 1,200 hotel rooms have been added in Hollywood area between 2001 and 2016. Four thousand new apartments and over thirty low to mid-rise development projects were approved in 2019.

Secession movement

In 2002, some Hollywood voters began a campaign for the area to secede from Los Angeles and become a separate municipality. In June of that year, the Los Angeles County Board of Supervisors placed secession referendums for both Hollywood and the San Fernando Valley on the ballot. To pass, they required the approval of a majority of voters in the proposed new municipality as well as a majority of voters in all of Los Angeles. In the November election, both measures failed by wide margins in the citywide vote.

Geography
According to the Mapping L.A. project of The Los Angeles Times, Hollywood is flanked by Hollywood Hills to the north, Los Feliz to the northeast, East Hollywood or Virgil Village to the east, Larchmont and Hancock Park to the south, Fairfax to the southwest, West Hollywood to the west, and Hollywood Hills West to the northwest.

Street limits of the Hollywood neighborhood are: north, Hollywood Boulevard from La Brea Avenue to the east boundary of Wattles Garden Park and Franklin Avenue between Bonita and Western avenues; east, Western Avenue; south, Melrose Avenue, and west, La Brea Avenue or the West Hollywood city line.

In 1918, H. J. Whitley commissioned architect A. S. Barnes to design Whitley Heights as a Mediterranean-style village on the hills above Hollywood Boulevard. It became the first celebrity community.

Other areas within Hollywood are Franklin Village, Little Armenia, Spaulding Square, Thai Town, and Yucca Corridor.

Failed trademarking attempt
In 1994, Hollywood, Alabama, and ten other towns named Hollywood successfully fought an attempt by the Hollywood Chamber of Commerce to trademark the name and force same-named communities to pay royalties to it.

Climate 

Like the rest of Los Angeles, Hollywood has a hot-summer Mediterranean climate (Köppen: Csa) or dry-summer subtropical climate. Winters are typically mild and rainy, but there are still plenty of warm, sunny days in the winter, as well. Summers are hot, sunny and dry, with virtually no rain falling between April and October; while summer days can be hot, they are considerably cooler than in the San Fernando Valley. Spring and fall are generally warm, sunny, and pleasant. Santa Ana winds typically occur during the fall and winter months, although they can occur during any month; Santa Ana winds bring heavy winds, higher temperatures and lower humidity levels, which increases the risk of wildfires, especially in dry years. Smog can sometimes occur during the summer months. May and June can be foggy and cloudy in Hollywood, a phenomenon known by southern California residents as "May Gray" or "June Gloom".

Demographics

The 2000 U.S. census counted 77,818 residents in the  Hollywood neighborhood—an average of 22,193 people per square mile (8,569 per km2), the seventh-densest neighborhood in all of Los Angeles County. In 2008 the city estimated that the population had increased to 85,489. The median age for residents was 31, about the city's average.

Hollywood was said to be "highly diverse" when compared to the city at large. The ethnic breakdown in 2000 was 42.2% Latino or Hispanic, 41% Non-Hispanic White, 7.1% Asian, 5.2% black, and 4.5% other. Mexico (21.3%) and Guatemala (13%) were the most common places of birth for the 53.8% of the residents who were born abroad, a figure that was considered high for the city as a whole.

The median household income in 2008 was $33,694, considered low for Los Angeles. The average household size of 2.1 people was also lower than the city norm. Renters occupied 92.4% of the housing units, and home- or apartment owners the rest.

The percentages of never-married men (55.1%), never-married women (39.8%) and widows (9.6%) were among the county's highest. There were 2,640 families headed by single parents, about average for Los Angeles.

In 2000, there were 2,828 military veterans, or 4.5%, a low rate for the city as a whole.

Radio and television
KNX was the last radio station to broadcast from Hollywood before it left CBS Columbia Square for a studio in the Miracle Mile in 2005.

On January 22, 1947, the first commercial television station west of the Mississippi River, KTLA, began operating in Hollywood. In December of that year, The Public Prosecutor became the first network television series to be filmed in Hollywood. Television stations KTLA and KCET, both on Sunset Boulevard, are the last broadcasters (television or radio) with Hollywood addresses, but KCET has since sold its studios to the Church of Scientology on Sunset, and plans to move to another location. KNBC moved in 1962 from the former NBC Radio City Studios at the northeast corner of Sunset Boulevard and Vine Street to NBC Studios in Burbank. KTTV moved in 1996 from its former home at Metromedia Square on Sunset Boulevard to West Los Angeles, and KCOP left its home on La Brea Avenue to join KTTV at the modern-day Fox Television Center. KCBS-TV and KCAL-TV moved from their longtime home at CBS Columbia Square on Sunset Boulevard to a new facility at CBS Studio Center in Studio City.

Government

As a neighborhood within the Los Angeles city limits, Hollywood does not have its own municipal government. A person was appointed by the Hollywood Chamber of Commerce to serve as an honorary "Mayor of Hollywood" for ceremonial purposes. Johnny Grant held this position from 1980 until his death on January 9, 2008.

Emergency services
The Los Angeles Police Department is responsible for police services. The Hollywood police station is at 1358 N. Wilcox Avenue.

Los Angeles Fire Department operates four fire stations, 27, 41, 52, and 82  in the area.

The Los Angeles County Department of Health Services operates the Hollywood-Wilshire Health Center in Hollywood.

Post office
The United States Postal Service operates the Hollywood Post Office, the Hollywood Pavilion Post Office, and the Sunset Post Office.

Neighborhood councils
Hollywood is included within the Hollywood United Neighborhood Council (HUNC), Hollywood Hills West Neighborhood Council, and the Hollywood Studio District Neighborhood Council. Neighborhood Councils cast advisory votes on such issues as zoning, planning, and other community issues. The council members are voted in by stakeholders, generally defined as anyone living, working, owning property, or belonging to an organization within the boundaries of the council.

Education

Hollywood residents aged 25 and older holding a four-year degree amounted to 28% of the population in 2000, about the same as in the county at large.

Public libraries
The Will and Ariel Durant Branch, John C. Fremont Branch, and the Frances Howard Goldwyn – Hollywood Regional Branch of the Los Angeles Public Library are in Hollywood.

Schools
Public schools are operated by the Los Angeles Unified School District (LAUSD).

Schools in Hollywood include:
 Temple Israel of Hollywood Day School, private, 7300 Hollywood Boulevard
 Gardner Street Elementary School, LAUSD, 7450 Hawthorne Avenue
 Selma Avenue Elementary School, LAUSD, 6611 Selma Avenue
 Grant Elementary School, 1530 North Wilton Place
 Young Hollywood, private elementary, 1547 North McCadden Place
 Hollywood High School, LAUSD, 1521 North Highland Avenue
 Hollywood Community Adult School, LAUSD, 1521 North Highland Avenue
 Blessed Sacrament School, private elementary, 6641 Sunset Boulevard
 Helen Bernstein High School, LAUSD, 1309 North Wilton Place
 Richard A. Alonzo Community Day School, LAUSD, 5755 Fountain Avenue
 Beverly Hills RC School, private elementary, 6550 Fountain Avenue
 Hollywood Schoolhouse, private elementary, 1233 North McCadden Place
 Joseph LeConte Middle School, LAUSD, 1316 North Bronson Avenue
 Hollywood Primary Center, LAUSD elementary, 1115 Tamarind Avenue
 Santa Monica Boulevard Community Charter School, 1022 North Van Ness Avenue
 Vine Street Elementary School, LAUSD, 955 North Vine Street
 Hubert Howe Bancroft Middle School, LAUSD, 929 North Las Palmas Avenue
 Larchmont Charter School, elementary, 815 North El Centro Avenue
 Cheder Menachem, private elementary, 1606 South La Cienega Boulevard

Colleges
 Columbia College Hollywood, 6255 Sunset Boulevard
 Emerson College, 5960 Sunset Boulevard
 Los Angeles Film School, 6363 Sunset Boulevard

Notable places

CBS Columbia Square
Charlie Chaplin Studios
Cinerama Dome
Crossroads of the World
Dolby Theatre
Earl Carroll Theatre (currently Nickelodeon on Sunset)
El Capitan Theatre
Frederick's of Hollywood
Gower Gulch
Grauman's Chinese Theatre
Grauman's Egyptian Theatre
Hollywood & Western Building
Ovation Hollywood
Hollywood and Vine
Hollywood Forever Cemetery
Hollywood Heritage Museum
Hollywood Palladium
Hollywood Masonic Temple
Hollywood Museum
Hollywood Walk of Fame
Hollywood Wax Museum
Knickerbocker Hotel
Madame Tussauds Hollywood
Musso & Frank Grill
Pantages Theatre
Roosevelt Hotel
Sunset Gower Studios

Annual events

The Academy Awards are held in late February/early March (since 2004) of each year, honoring the preceding year in film. Prior to 2004, they were held in late March/early April. Since 2002, the Oscars have been held at their new home at the Dolby (formerly Kodak) Theater at Hollywood Boulevard and Highland Avenue.

The annual Hollywood Christmas Parade: The 2006 parade on Nov 26 was the 75th edition of the Christmas Parade. The parade goes down Hollywood Boulevard and is broadcast in the Los Angeles area on KTLA, and around the United States on Tribune-owned stations and the WGN superstation.

The Hollywood Half Marathon takes place in April (since 2012) of each year, to raise funds and awareness for local youth homeless shelters. The event includes a Half Marathon, 10K, 5K, and Kids Fun Run along Hollywood Blvd.

Gallery

See also

Bibliography of Hollywood
Bibliography of Los Angeles
Community newspapers in Hollywood
Documentary films about Hollywood
Films about Hollywood
List of Hollywood novels
List of Los Angeles Historic-Cultural Monuments in Hollywood

References

 
1853 establishments in California
California culture
Central Los Angeles
Cinema of the United States
Film production districts
Former municipalities in California
Neighborhoods in Los Angeles
Northwest Los Angeles
Populated places established in 1853